"Metal & Dust" is a song written by Dot Major, Hannah Reid and Dan Rothman of British indie pop band London Grammar. The song was originally recorded by the band for inclusion on their début studio album, If You Wait, and appears as the eighth track on the album.

Samples
Rapper/producer Impossible Beats sampled the song in his 2014 single "High School" from his album Truancy.

Track listings

Charts

Weekly charts

Release history

References

2013 singles
London Grammar songs
2013 songs
Songs written by Hannah Reid
Songs written by Dan Rothman
Songs written by Dominic Major